David C. Dickson Jr. (March 22, 1792 - July 31, 1836) was a state legislator, Mississippi Secretary of State, Lieutenant Governor of Mississippi and a U.S. Representative from Mississippi.

Early life and career
David C. Dickson Jr. was born on March 22, 1792, in Georgia. He was the son of David Dickson Sr. and his second wife, Martha (Cureton) Dickson. Dickson moved to Mississippi. He studied medicine and worked as a physician in Pike County.

Political career
In 1817, he served as a delegate to the Georgia Constitutional Convention in 1817. He was a Brigadier general of the state militia in 1818. He served in the Mississippi Senate in 1820 and 1821.
He was the third Lieutenant Governor of Mississippi from January 7, 1822, to January 7, 1824, serving under Governor Walter Leake. He was Postmaster of Jackson, Mississippi in 1822. He was an unsuccessful candidate for Governor of Mississippi in 1823. He served as delegate to the state constitutional convention in 1832 and was an unsuccessful candidate for president of the convention. He was Secretary of the Mississippi State Senate in 1833 and Mississippi Secretary of State from January 1833 to January 1835.

Dickson was elected as an Anti-Jacksonian to the Twenty-fourth Congress (March 4, 1835 – July 31, 1836). He died on July 31, 1836, in Hot Springs, Arkansas.

See also
List of United States Congress members who died in office (1790–1899)

References

1792 births
1836 deaths
People from Georgia (U.S. state)
National Republican Party members of the United States House of Representatives from Mississippi
Lieutenant Governors of Mississippi
Mississippi postmasters
American militia generals
Politicians from Jackson, Mississippi
People from Pike County, Mississippi
Members of the United States House of Representatives from Mississippi